Suriname competed at the 2022 World Games held in Birmingham, United States from 7 to 17 July 2022.

Competitors

Korfball
Suriname qualified for the Korfball competition by finishing sixth at the 2019 IKF World Korfball Championship.

References

Nations at the 2022 World Games
2022
World Games